Denis Daly (1748 – 10 October 1791) of Carrownakelly and Dunsandle Castle, Loughrea, County Galway, was an Irish landowner and politician.

Biography 
His father was James Daly of Carrownakelly and Dunsandle in County Galway, and his mother was Catherine Gore, daughter of Sir Ralph Gore, 4th Baronet and his second wife Elizabeth Ashe. He was the eldest of five sons. His siblings included St George Daly, judge of the Court of King's Bench (Ireland). He was the great-grandson of Denis Daly, judge of the Court of Common Pleas (Ireland). Though traditionally Roman Catholics, and of Gaelic origin, the Dalys had been able to hold on to their lands by converting to the Protestant faith and forsaking their allegiance to the Stuart dynasty.

He was educated at Christ Church, Oxford, but there is no record of his taking a degree there.

Daly owned estates in County Mayo, County Galway, County Clare, and County Limerick. He had to sell off half of these estates to pay his debts, but on his marriage to Lady Henrietta Maxwell, the only daughter of Robert Maxwell, 1st Earl of Farnham and Henrietta Cantillon, widow of the 3rd Earl of Stafford, his fortunes once again increased. His family residence was Carrownakelly Castle, in the parish of Kiltullagh, where the Dalys had lived for several generations, but  he moved some four miles south towards Loughrea where he built Dunsandle House, sometime in the mid-18th century. In 1769 and 1772 he served as Mayor of Galway.

Political career 

Daly was a friend of Henry Grattan, who had great respect for his political skills, and like him, sat in the Irish House of Commons. Between 1767 and 1768, he was Member of Parliament for Galway Borough. Subsequently, he represented Galway County until 1790, and then again Galway Borough until 1792. In 1783, he was also elected for the latter constituency, but chose not to sit. He never held high Ministerial office but was appointed Muster Master General. He was a fine orator but did not often speak in Parliament; when he did it was usually from a carefully prepared script.

Character 
He had a  reputation for laziness, but he was intelligent, good-humoured, and a fine classical scholar. Grattan called him one of the best and brightest characters Ireland had ever produced, and said that his early death was a tragedy for his country. Grattan even suggested that Daly's wisdom and moderation, had he lived, might have prevented the Irish Rebellion of 1798.

Family 

His eldest son James represented Galway County in the Parliament of the United Kingdom and was later raised to the peerage. A younger son, Robert, was a leading Irish evangelical who became Bishop of Cashel and Waterford, and was noted for his hostility to Roman Catholics. He also had six daughters. His widow died at a great age in 1852.

References
 
 The Lords of Dunsandle, James Noel Dillon, in  Kiltullagh/Killimordaly: As the Centuries passed: A history from 1500-1900, pp. 43–67, ed. Kieran Jordan, 2000.
 Clare bards, Galway gentry, Patrick Melvin, The Irish Genealogist, 2002
 The Daly Chronicle, Dermot Daly,The Irish Genealogist, 2002

1748 births
1791 deaths
Irish MPs 1761–1768
Irish MPs 1769–1776
Irish MPs 1776–1783
Irish MPs 1783–1790
Irish MPs 1790–1797
Members of the Parliament of Ireland (pre-1801) for County Galway constituencies
Mayors of Galway
Politicians from County Galway
Irish duellists
Members of the Privy Council of Ireland